Bernard S. Meyerson (born 2 June 1954) is an American solid state physicist. 

Meyerson is a native of New York City, born on 2 June 1954. After graduating from the City College of New York, he completed a master's degree and doctorate at the City University of New York, and began working for IBM. 

Meyerson was elected a fellow of the American Physical Society in 1998, "for the invention of ultra-high vacuum chemical vapor deposition and its application to low temperature silicon epitaxy, especially the fabrication of SiGe heterojunction bipolar integrated circuits for wireless telecommunications." The APS awarded him the George E. Pake Prize in 2011. Meyerson received the J. J. Ebers Award in 2000 from the IEEE Electron Devices Society. In 2002, Meyerson became an elected member of the National Academy of Engineering.

References

1954 births
Living people
20th-century American physicists
21st-century American physicists
IBM people
City College of New York alumni
Scientists from New York City
Fellows of the American Physical Society
Members of the United States National Academy of Engineering